John French may refer to:

Military
 John French, 1st Earl of Ypres (1852–1925), commander of the British Expeditionary Force in World War I
 John French, 2nd Earl of Ypres (1881–1958), British soldier and artist, son of the 1st Earl
 John French, 3rd Earl of Ypres (1921–1988), British peer, son of John French, 2nd Earl of Ypres
 Jack French (John Alexander French, 1914–1942), Australian soldier, Victoria Cross recipient

Politics
 John French (died 1420), MP for Winchelsea
 John French (MP for Hythe), see Hythe
 John French (MP for Winchester), British Member of Parliament for Winchester
 John French (judge) (1670–1728), Justice of the Colonial Delaware Supreme Court
 John William French (1888–1970), Canadian politician

Sports
 John French (field hockey) (born 1946), British Olympic hockey player
 John French (ice hockey) (born 1950), Canadian ice hockey player
 John French (racing driver) (born 1930), Australian racing driver
 John French (speed skater) (born 1955), British Olympic speed skater

Other
 John French (physician) (1616–1657), English doctor and chemist
 John French (Dean of Elphin) (1770–1848), Anglican priest in Ireland
 John French (academic), Oxford college head
 John W. French (1808–1871), American Episcopal clergyman 
 John R. French (1819–1890), American publisher, editor, and politician
 John French (photographer) (1907–1966), English photographer
 John R. P. French (1913–1995), American psychologist 
 John French (musician) (born 1948), American rock drummer

See also
 Jay Jay French (born 1952), also called John French, American guitarist